The First Palaszczuk Ministry was a ministry of the Government of Queensland led by Annastacia Palaszczuk.
Palaszczuk led the Labor Party to victory in the 2015 state election, forming a minority government with the support of independent MP Peter Wellington. Her interim ministry was sworn in on 14 February 2015 by Governor Paul de Jersey. The full Palaszczuk Ministry was sworn in two days later. Several changes were made to the ministry on 8 December 2015, with 3 cabinet positions and one assistant ministry added.

Interim ministry
The interim ministry, a triumvirate consisting of Annastacia Palaszczuk, Jackie Trad and Curtis Pitt, was sworn in on 14 February 2015. It had only one more member than the First Whitlam Ministry, which was a duumvirate and the smallest ministry in Australia's history.

It was only the second Australian ministry in which both the Premier and Deputy Premier were women; the first was Kristina Keneally and Carmel Tebbutt in New South Wales (4 December 2009 to 28 March 2011).

First full ministry
The full ministry was sworn in on 16 February 2015. The full ministry was majority female (8 of 14), a first in Australia.

First reshuffle
On 7 December 2015, Premier Palaszczuk announced several changes to the ministry, including the expansion of cabinet from 14 ministers to 17, and the inclusion of a second assistant minister. The announcement followed the resignation of the Minister for Police, Fire and Emergency Services, Jo-Ann Miller. The new ministry was sworn in at Government House on 8 December 2015. Following the reshuffle, the Palaszczuk Ministry maintained its female majority (9 of 17).

Second reshuffle
On 11 November 2016, Premier Palaszczuk announced several changes to the ministry, following the resignation of the Minister for Agriculture and Fisheries, Leanne Donaldson. Following the reshuffle, the Palaszczuk Ministry lost its female majority (8 of 17).

Third reshuffle
On 10 February 2017, Premier Palaszczuk announced several changes to the ministry, following the resignation of the Minister for Transport, Stirling Hinchliffe.

See also
 Shadow ministry of Annastacia Palaszczuk
 Shadow ministry of Lawrence Springborg
 Shadow ministry of Tim Nicholls

References

Queensland ministries
2015 establishments in Australia
Australian Labor Party ministries in Queensland